Rhytiphora spinosa is a species of beetle in the family Cerambycidae. It was described by James Thomson in 1864, originally under the genus Platyomopsis.

References

spinosa
Beetles described in 1864